Ryan Park may refer to:

People
Ryan Y. Park, Korean American lawyer and Solicitor General of North Carolina
Ryan Park (politician), an Australian politician
Ryan Park (entertainer), an American comedian and recording artist

Places
Ryan Park, Wyoming, an unincorporated place in Carbon County, Wyoming, USA
Leo J. Ryan Memorial Park, a recreational city park located in Foster City, California, USA
Ryan Provincial Park, a provincial park in British Columbia, Canada
Archbishop Ryan Park, a park in Merrion Square, Dublin, Ireland